Lewy bodies are the inclusion bodies – abnormal aggregations of protein – that develop inside nerve cells affected by Parkinson's disease (PD), the Lewy body dementias (Parkinson's disease dementia and dementia with Lewy bodies (DLB)), and some other disorders. They are also seen in cases of multiple system atrophy, particularly the parkinsonian variant (MSA-P).

Lewy bodies appear as spherical masses in the cytoplasm that displace other cell components. For instance, some Lewy bodies tend to displace the nucleus to one side of the cell. There are two main kinds of Lewy bodies: classical and cortical. Lewy bodies may be found in the midbrain (within the substantia nigra) or within the cortex.  A classical Lewy body is an eosinophilic cytoplasmic inclusion consisting of a dense core surrounded by a halo of 10-nm-wide radiating fibrils, the primary structural component of which is alpha-synuclein.

History
In 1910, Fritz Heinrich Lewy was studying in Berlin for his doctorate. He was the first doctor to notice some unusual proteins in the brain, comparing them to earlier findings by Gonzalo Rodríguez Lafora. In 1913, Lafora described another case, and acknowledged Lewy as the discoverer, naming them cuerpos intracelulares de Lewy (intracellular Lewy bodies). Konstantin Nikolaevich Trétiakoff found them in 1919 in the substantia nigra of PD brains, called them corps de Lewy and is credited with the eponym. In 1923, Lewy published his findings in a book, The Study on Muscle Tone and Movement. Including Systematic Investigations on the Clinic, Physiology, Pathology, and Pathogenesis of Paralysis agitans. Eliasz Engelhardt, who is in the neurology department at Federal University of Rio de Janeiro, argued in 2017 that Lafora should be credited with the eponym, because he named them six years before Trétiakoff. Nonetheless, Trétiakoff is still the primary figure acknowledged for coining the term, “Lewy bodies.” 

According to the Journal of the History of the Neurosciences, Dr. Lewy became interested in studying more about the brain (neurology), because of the discovery that Alois Alzheimer made in 1906. The article mentions that the third reported case of Alzheimer's disease had histological structures that happened to be similar to Lewy body histology slides, but the contribution was not given to Lewy's finding.

Cell biology 

A Lewy body is composed of the protein alpha-synuclein associated with other proteins, such as ubiquitin, neurofilament protein, and alpha B crystallin. Tau proteins may also be present, and Lewy bodies may occasionally be surrounded by neurofibrillary tangles. Lewy bodies and neurofibrillary tangles can occasionally exist in the same neuron, particularly in the amygdala.

Alpha-synuclein modulates DNA repair processes, including repair of DNA double-strand breaks (DSBs) by the process of non-homologous end joining The repair function of alpha-synuclein appears to be greatly reduced in Lewy body bearing neurons, and this reduction may trigger cell death. Mutations are the reason behind their damaged repair function. One mutation in particular, in the gene encoding for presynaptic alpha-synuclein, was found to have been passed down from family members with PD. Similarly in regards to DLB, Lewy bodies retrieved from DLB brains were found to contain alpha-synuclein proteins that were shortened by mutations. 

Lewy bodies are believed to represent an aggresome response in the cell. When misfolded proteins aggregate, or clump together, many diseases are more likely to develop, including those that are associated with Lewy bodies. Aggregation is believed to occur when there is a high amount of misfolded proteins in the ubiquitin-proteasome pathway, which are then brought to a resulting aggresome so they can be organized into one place. Since Lewy bodies are made of ubiquitinated proteins that would be handled in the ubiquitin-proteasome pathway, they may be made from this or a similar process if the pathway capacity is indeed exceeded by misfolded proteins that aggregate together. Accordingly, the aggresome, where the damaged proteins fully aggregate, is akin to the Lewy body.

Despite their differences, there is evidence that a particular protein family, called 14-3-3, plays a role in the formation of both cortical and classical Lewy bodies. This makes it an important protein family in regards to Lewy body-associated diseases, and there are at least 7 forms of it that have been clearly identified in mammals.

Cortical Lewy bodies are also composed of alpha-synuclein fibrils, but are less defined and lack halos. This kind of Lewy body is one of those aforementioned that regularly displaces the nucleus. In histopathology, cortical Lewy bodies are a distinguishing feature for dementia with Lewy bodies, but may occasionally be seen in ballooned neurons characteristic of behavioural variant frontotemporal dementia and corticobasal degeneration, as well as in patients with other tauopathies.

Lewy neurites

Lewy neurites are abnormal neurites in diseased neurons, containing granular material and abnormal α-synuclein filaments similar to those found in Lewy bodies. Like Lewy bodies, Lewy neurites are a feature of α-synucleinopathies such as dementia with Lewy bodies, Parkinson's disease, and multiple system atrophy. They are also found in the CA2-3 region of the hippocampus in Alzheimer's disease.

See also 
 Lewy body dementia#Society and culture
 Proteopathy

References

External links 

 Lewy Body Dementia Association

Lewy body dementia
Parkinson's disease
Neuropathology
Anatomy named for one who described it